Henry Thorpe (died 1416), of Boscombe, Wiltshire, was an English politician.

He was a Member (MP) of the Parliament of England for Wiltshire in 1411.

References

14th-century births
1416 deaths
English MPs 1411
Members of the Parliament of England (pre-1707) for Wiltshire